Federal Medical Centre, Birnin Kudu is a federal government of Nigeria medical centre located in Birnin Kudu, Jigawa State, Nigeria. The current chief medical director is Dr Adamu Abdullahi Atterwahmie.

History 
Federal Medical Centre, Birnin Kudu was established in 1961. The hospital was formerly known as General Hospital, Birnin Kudu.

CMD 
The current chief medical director is Dr Adamu Abdullahi Atterwahmie.

References 

Hospitals in Nigeria